Saxinis saucia is a species of case-bearing leaf beetle in the family Chrysomelidae. It is found in Central America and North America.

Subspecies
These nine subspecies belong to the species Saxinis saucia:
 Saxinis saucia bisignata (Walker in Lord, 1866)
 Saxinis saucia californica Schaeffer, 1906
 Saxinis saucia immaculata Moldenke, 1970
 Saxinis saucia inyoensis Moldenke, 1970
 Saxinis saucia kaibabiae Moldenke, 1970
 Saxinis saucia monoensis Moldenke, 1970
 Saxinis saucia propinqua Jacoby, 1878
 Saxinis saucia saucia J. L. LeConte, 1857
 Saxinis saucia speculifera Horn, 1892

References

Further reading

External links

 

Clytrini
Articles created by Qbugbot
Beetles described in 1857